Terengganu City Football Club is a Malaysian football club based in Kuala Terengganu, Terengganu, Malaysia. The club currently plays in the third tier league of Malaysian football, the Malaysia FAM League. 2017 is the club debut in the Malaysian football.

Season by season record

History

The club was founded in June 2016 as Terengganu City Football Club.

In the 2018, Terengganu City won the championship in their inaugural season, after beating Selangor United 2-0 at the KLFA Stadium. As finalist together with Selangor United, The Sharks qualified for automatic promotion into the Malaysia Premier League.

However, on 28 November 2018, Malaysia Football League barred Terengganu City from participating in the 2019 Malaysia Premier League, as a result of financial problems within the team's management and claims of several players and staff for unpaid wages. Terengganu City management later formed a new club, Langkawi FC, but it is unclear if the club will replace Terengganu City or what league it will play.

Current squad
As of 19 February 2018

<!—- International players should not be bolded. See Wikipedia:WikiProject Football/Clubs#To be avoided for reasoning. —->

Transfers

For recent transfers, see List of Malaysian football transfers 2018

Club staff
''

Honours

League

Malaysia FAM League
 Winners (1): 2018

References

External links
 Official Website

Football clubs in Malaysia